Open the States is a website associated with Convention of States, also known as Convention of States Action, an "ad-hoc coalition" of individuals who want government to end some or all of the restrictions on economic activity and public life that were imposed as a response to the COVID-19 pandemic in the United States. Convention of States Action's parent organization is Citizens for Self-Governance. According to Politico, "The Convention of States' efforts are among several national conservative groups, such as FreedomWorks, that have helped organize anti-lockdown protests across the country." Center for Media and Democracy said Citizens for Self-Governance "does business as the Convention of States Foundation (COSF)"; Boston University's BU Today stated "Convention of States created a sock puppet organization called Open the States to hide their role in the campaign".

See also 
 COVID-19 anti-lockdown protests in the United States
 Convention of States Project
 Democratic backsliding in the United States
 Donors Capital Fund
 Donors Trust

References

Further reading

External links 
 Open the States official website (archived)
 Convention of States Action official website

American conservative websites
COVID-19 pandemic in the United States
Protests over responses to the COVID-19 pandemic
Right-wing populism in the United States
Websites about the COVID-19 pandemic